Suryamati is a village development committee in Nuwakot District in the Bagmati Zone of central Nepal. At the time of the 1991 Nepal census it had a population of 4047.

References

External links
UN map of the municipalities of Nuwakot District

Populated places in Nuwakot District